Michael Bruce Colegrove is an American educator and was the fifth President of Hargrave Military Academy.

Biography

Michael B. Colegrove serves as Vice President Emeritus and Professor of Education for the University of the Cumberlands located in Williamsburg, Kentucky. Colegrove served at Cumberland in various capacities for forty years. He served for two years (1987–1989) as President of Hagrave Military Academy (HMA).

In the fall of 1987, Colegrove was inaugurated as the fourth President of HMA. The inaugural ceremony saw C. Roger Harris, HMA Class of 1951 and Chairman of the Board of Trustees, deliver the charge and presentation of the emblems of office: a presidential sword engraved with the names of HMA's past presidents, and a bronze cast of the Hargrave seal.  Colegrove served as President of HMA until July 1989, when he resigned.

He served as a member of the U. S. Army Reserve for 30 years and retired at the rank of colonel. He commanded units at all levels. His final assignment was with the U. S. Army War College as a staff instructor.

Dr. Colegrove has been actively involved in teaching and administration since earning a bachelor's degree from Cumberland College in 1971. He also earned a Master of Arts Degree from Eastern Kentucky University and a Doctor of Philosophy Degree from Vanderbilt University. He is also a graduate on the United States Army War College.

Actively involved in his community and church, Colegrove serves as a member of the board of directors of the area chapters of the American Red Cross, the American Cancer Society and the American Heart Association. He has served as a director of Dayspring Healthcare System, Inc. and is currently on the board of directors of Cumberland River Comprehensive Care Center and the board of directors of the Southern Kentucky Chamber of Commerce.

He is past president of the Williamsburg Independent School PTA and the Williamsburg Kiwanis Club. He served as Lt. Governor for Region 6 Kentucky - Tennessee Kiwanis in 2000. He currently serves First Baptist Church of Williamsburg as a Deacon and Sunday School Teacher.

He is the author of the six books and has conducted workshops and seminars nationally and internationally.

References

Years of Change; Years of Growth: A History of Hargrave Military Academy 1970-2003, 2004, by Mary M. Tallent

Year of birth missing (living people)
Living people
American writers
United States Army reservists
University of the Cumberlands faculty